Richard Clayton Enerson (born March 6, 1997) is an American professional racing driver. He is the son of former Indy Lights team owner Neil Enerson, who owned Team E Racing and has previously competed part-time in the NASCAR Cup Series.

Racing career

After participating in karting and Skip Barber regional racing, Enerson made his professional debut in the 2012 U.S. F2000 National Championship in National Class. He finished in third place with four class victories. He returned to the series in 2013 driving for ZSports/Team E and finished 9th in the championship with 2 podium finishes at Mid-Ohio Sports Car Course. Enerson switched to his family's own team for the 2014 U.S. F2000 Winterfest and won the championship, capturing two wins and two other podium finishes in the six races. In the 2014 U.S. F2000 National Championship, Enerson finished second in the championship by only 9 points behind champion Florian Latorre. Enerson won five races, the most of any driver that season, including a sweep of both races at Barber Motorsports Park.

Enerson moved two steps up the Mazda Road to Indy in 2015, competing in the Indy Lights series with Schmidt Peterson Motorsports. Enerson took his first Indy Lights victory with Schmidt Peterson Motorsports at Mid-Ohio Sports Car Course after four podiums in the 2015 season.

Enerson started 2016 competing in Indy Lights again, but following the Freedom 100, he dropped out of the series to pursue a seat in the IndyCar Series. This paid off later in the season, when Dale Coyne Racing signed him to drive at Mid-Ohio, then later extended his contract to include Watkins Glen and Sonoma.

Enerson drove the No. 31 car of Carlin Racing at the 2019 Honda 200 in the NTT IndyCar Series.

It was announced on August 3, 2020 that Enerson would compete in his first NASCAR race, driving in the Xfinity Series race at Road America in the No. 07 for SS-Green Light Racing.

Enerson and his father Neil Enerson purchased 2 complete Dallara DW12 Indycar chassis. A deal was struck with IndyCar newcomers Top Gun Racing to loan the chassis, as well as additional equipment, to the team so that Enerson could be entered in the series. On May 10, 2021, Enerson took part in a test session with Top Gun Racing at World Wide Technology Raceway. On May 12, IndyCar confirmed that Enerson and Top Gun Racing will attempt to qualify for the 2021 Indianapolis 500. After taking part in the last row shootout, Enerson failed to qualify for the 2021 Indianapolis 500.

Enerson and his father were later embroiled in a legal dispute with Top Gun Racing for the return of the 2 chassis and the equipment loaned earlier in the season. This was finally resolved in May 2022. Following this, Enerson and his father announced that plans were underway to enter the 2023 IndyCar Series.

Motorsports career results

NASCAR
(key) (Bold – Pole position awarded by qualifying time. Italics – Pole position earned by points standings or practice time. * – Most laps led.)

Cup Series

Xfinity Series

 Season still in progress
 Ineligible for series points

American open–wheel racing
(key) (Races in bold indicate pole position; races in italics indicate fastest lap)

U.S. F2000 National Championship

Indy Lights

IndyCar Series

Indianapolis 500

WeatherTech SportsCar Championship

References

External links
 
 
 

1997 births
Living people
People from New Port Richey, Florida
Racing drivers from Florida
IndyCar Series drivers
Indy Lights drivers
U.S. F2000 National Championship drivers
WeatherTech SportsCar Championship drivers
NASCAR drivers
Carlin racing drivers
Arrow McLaren SP drivers
Dale Coyne Racing drivers